The 2018 Ferrari Challenge Europe is the 25th season of Ferrari Challenge Europe. The season consisted of 7 rounds, starting at the Mugello Circuit on March 24 and ending at the Autodromo Nazionale Monza on November 3.

Calendar

Entry list
All teams and drivers used the Ferrari 488 Challenge fitted with Pirelli tyres.

Trofeo Pirelli

Coppa Shell

Results and standings

Race results

Championship standings
Points were awarded to the top ten classified finishers as follows:

Trofeo Pirelli

Coppa Shell

See also
 2018 Finali Mondiali

References

External links
 Official website

Europe 2018
Ferrari Challenge Europe